The Rolling Stones' 1965 1st American Tour was a concert tour by the band. The tour commenced on April 23 and concluded on May 29, 1965. On this tour, the band supported their album The Rolling Stones, Now!.

The Rolling Stones
Mick Jagger - lead vocals, harmonica, percussion
Keith Richards - guitar, backing vocals
Brian Jones - guitar, harmonica, organ, backing vocals
Bill Wyman - bass guitar, backing vocals
Charlie Watts - drums

Tour set list
Songs performed include:
Everybody Needs Somebody To Love
Around And Around
Off The Hook
Little Red Rooster
Time Is On My Side
Carol
It's All Over Now
Route 66
I'm Alright
Pain In My Heart
The Last Time

Tour dates
23/04/1965 Montreal, Canada, Maurice Richard Arena
24/04/1965 Ottawa, Canada, Auditorium
25/04/1965 Toronto, Canada, Maple Leaf Gardens
26/04/1965 London, Canada, Treasure Island Gardens
29/04/1965 Albany, New York, Palace Theatre (2 shows)
30/04/1965 Worcester, Massachusetts, Memorial Auditorium
01/05/1965 New York City, Academy Of Music
01/05/1965 Philadelphia, Pennsylvania, Convention Hall
04/05/1965 Statesboro, Georgia, Southern College, Hanner Gymnasium
06/05/1965 Clearwater, Florida, Jack Russell Stadium
07/05/1965 Birmingham, Alabama, Legion Field
08/05/1965 Jacksonville, Florida, Coliseum
09/05/1965 Chicago, Illinois, Arie Crown Theater
14/05/1965 San Francisco, California, New Civic Auditorium
15/05/1965 San Bernardino, California, Swing Auditorium
16/05/1965 Long Beach, California, Civic Auditorium
17/05/1965 San Diego, California, Community Concourse, Convention Hall
21/05/1965 San Jose, California, Civic Auditorium
22/05/1965 Fresno, California, Ratcliffe Stadium
23/05/1965 Sacramento, California, Municipal Auditorium
29/05/1965 New York City, Academy Of Music (3 shows)

References
 Carr, Roy.  The Rolling Stones: An Illustrated Record.  Harmony Books, 1976.  

The Rolling Stones concert tours
1965 concert tours
Concert tours of Canada
Concert tours of the United States